Bystander is a six track extended play by Canadian alternative rock band Jets Overhead. It was released on March 8, 2011 and was produced with Neil Osborne of 54-40. 
The EP is currently only available as a digital download. The songs on Bystander were originally recorded at the same time as No Nations, but were not included in No Nations because of stylistic difference.

Bystander was recorded on Hornby Island at the Joe King Hall and in Victoria, British Columbia at Seacoast Sound, the Alix Gooldon Hall, Miramontes Drive, and Eldorbud Place.

Track listing 
 "Bystander" – 3:27
 "Destroy You" – 4:36
 "It's Not Up To Me" – 4:46
 "Friendly Fire" – 3:27
 "Fully Shed (Kevin Hamilton Remix)" – 6:14
 "Bystander (Acoustic)" – 3:23

Personnel 
 Adam Kittredge: Vocals, Guitar
 Antonia Freybe-Smith: Vocals, Keyboards
 Jocelyn Greenwood: Bass
 Piers Henwood: Guitars, Keyboards
 Luke Renshaw: Drums, Percussion, Vocals

References

External links 
 Jets Overhead Official Website

Sources 
 Jets Overhead Official Website
 Jets Overhead Official Bandcamp

2011 EPs
Jets Overhead albums